The Baby Formula is a 2008 Canadian mockumentary film, directed by Alison Reid. The film stars Angela Vint and Megan Fahlenbock as Athena and Lilith, a lesbian couple each pregnant with the other's baby through an experimental stem cell procedure that created artificial sperm from their DNA.

The film's cast also includes Rosemary Dunsmore, Dmitry Chepovetsky, Matt Baram and Maggie Cassella.

Both Vint and Fahlenbock were actually pregnant in real life during the production of the film. Vint gave birth during filming, necessitating some adjustments to the production schedule.

The film premiered in August 2008 at the Montreal World Film Festival. It was screened at the Inside Out Film and Video Festival in Toronto in 2009, where it won the Audience Award for Best Feature Film.

See also 
 List of LGBT films directed by women

References

External links
 
 

2008 films
2000s mockumentary films
Canadian LGBT-related films
Lesbian-related films
Canadian mockumentary films
2000s pregnancy films
LGBT-related comedy films
2008 LGBT-related films
2008 comedy films
Canadian pregnancy films
English-language Canadian films
2000s English-language films
2000s Canadian films